Mariusz Adam Soska (born 11 June 1983) is a Polish former footballer who is last known to have played as a defender for Krško.

Career

Before the second half of 2006/07, Soska signed for Slovenian top flight side Drava Ptuj, where he did not receive payment for 6 months.

Before the second half of 2007/08, he signed for Nadnarwianka Pułtusk in the Polish fourth division.

Before the second half of 2009/10, he signed for Slovenian second division club Krško.

References

External links
 

1983 births
Living people
People from Pułtusk
Association football defenders
Polish footballers
Kujawiak Włocławek players
Warmia Grajewo players
Jeziorak Iława players
NK Drava Ptuj players
NK Krško players
Slovenian PrvaLiga players
Slovenian Second League players
Polish expatriate footballers
Expatriate footballers in Slovenia
Polish expatriate sportspeople in Slovenia